Bieszczady Mountains  is a mountain range that runs from the extreme south-east of Poland and north-east of Slovakia through to western Ukraine. It forms the western part of the Eastern Beskids, and is more generally part of the Outer Eastern Carpathians. The mountain range is situated between the Łupków Pass (640 m) and the Vyshkovskyi Pass (933 m). The highest peak of Bieszczady is Mt Pikui (1405 m) in Ukraine. The highest peak of the Polish part is Tarnica (1346 m).

Term
The term Bieszczady has been introduced into English from Polish. In Poland, the term usually refers (in the narrower sense) to the Polish part of the Bieszczady region, while in the wider sense it can also refer to the entire region. In Slovakia, the Bieszczady region is known as Beščady, while the Slovak part of the region is called Bukovec Mountains. Historically, the terms Bieszczady/Beščady/Бещади have been used for hundreds of years to describe the mountains separating the old Kingdom of Hungary from Poland. A Latin language source of 1269 refers to them as "Beschad Alpes Poloniae" (translated as: Bieszczady Mountains of Poland).

The Polish folk etymology holds the term Bieszczady to have stemmed from the terms Bies and Czad (possibly from Chort) along with the Polish plural y stem giving Bies + czady + y. Some folk stories connect the origin of the mountains to the demonic activity of the Biesy and Czady, while other folk stories tell of the mountains being populated with hordes of Biesy and Czady, hence the name. Another less probable possibility is the term being related to Middle Low German beshêt, beskēt, meaning watershed.

Division

Since there exist many variants of divisions of the mountain ranges and names for the Eastern Beskids (and Ukrainian Carpathians in general), several divisions are given in the following:

Division 1:
 Western Bieszczady mainly in Poland and Slovakia, including the Bukovec Mountains
 Eastern Bieszczady, mainly in Ukraine, stretching to the Skole Beskids

Division 2: 
 Western Bieszczady: between the Łupków Pass and the Użocka (Uzsok Pass - 853 m) with Mt Tarnica (1,346 m) as the highest peak; the Łupków Pass separating the Bieszczady from the Lower Beskids and Pogórze Bukowskie
 Central Bieszczady, between the Użocka Pass and the Tukholskyi Pass, with Mt Pikui (1405 m) as the highest peak
 Eastern Bieszczady, between the Tukholskyi Pass and the Vyshkovskyi Pass, with Mt Charna Repa (1228m) as the highest peak

Division 3:
In an old Ukrainian division, what is defined here as the Bieszczady in a wider sense corresponds to the western part of the Mid-Carpathian Depression and to the westernmost part of the Polonynian Beskids.

History

Settled in prehistoric times, the south-eastern Poland region that is now  Bieszczady was overrun in pre-Roman times by various tribes, including the Celts, Goths and Vandals (Przeworsk culture and Puchov culture). After the fall of the Roman Empire, of which most of south-eastern Poland was part (all parts below the San), Hungarians and West Slavs invaded the area.

The region subsequently became part of the Great Moravian state. Upon the invasion of the Hungarian tribes into the heart of the Great Moravian Empire around 899, the Lendians of the area declared their allegiance to the Hungarians. The region then became a site of contention between Poland, Kievan Rus and Hungary starting in at least the 9th century. This area was mentioned for the first time in 981, when Volodymyr the Great of Kievan Rus took the area over on the way into Poland. In 1018 it returned to Poland, 1031 back to Rus, in 1340 Casimir III of Poland recovered it.

Bieszczady was one of the strategically important areas of the Carpathian mountains bitterly contested in battles on the Eastern Front of World War I during the winter of 1914/1915.

Up until 1947, 84% of the population of the Polish part of the Bieszczadzkie Mountains was Boyko. The killing of the Polish General Karol Świerczewski in Jabłonki by the Ukrainian Insurgent Army in 1947 was the direct cause of the replacement of the Boykos, the so-called Operation Vistula. The area was mostly uninhabited afterward. In 2002, then president Aleksander Kwaśniewski expressed regret for this operation.

In 1991, the UNESCO East Carpathian Biosphere Reserve was created that encapsulates a large part of the area and continues into Slovakia and Ukraine. It comprises the Bieszczady National Park (Poland), Poloniny National Park (Slovakia) and the Uzhansky National Nature Park (Ukraine). Animals living in this reserve include, among others, black storks, brown bears, wolves and bison.

Hiking trails
 European walking route E8
Somár - sedlo Baba - Dolná Rakova - Končini - Brezová pod Bradlom - Polianka - Myjava - Veľká Javorina - Nové Mesto nad Váhom - Machnáč - Trenčín - Košecké Rovné - Fačkovské sedlo - Kunešov - Kraľová studňa - Donovaly - Chopok - Čertovica - Telgárt - Skalisko - Štós-kúpele - Skalisko - Chata Lajoška - Košice - Malý Šariš - Prešov - Miháľov - Kurimka - Dukla - Iwonicz-Zdrój – Rymanów-Zdrój - Puławy – Tokarnia (778 m) – Kamień (717 m) – Komańcza - Cisna - Ustrzyki Górne - Wołosate.

Motorsport
The mountains were used as a round in the 2014 International Hill Climb Cup.

Literature
Prof. Jadwiga Warszyńska. Karpaty Polskie : przyroda, człowiek i jego działalność ; Uniwersytet Jagielloński. Kraków, 1995  .
Prof. Jerzy Kondracki. Geografia fizyczna Polski  Warszawa : Państ. Wydaw. Naukowe, 1988,  .

Notes

Bibliography
 Rosa Lehmann, "Social(ist) engineering. Taming the devils of the Polish Bieszczady," Communist and Post-Communist Studies, 42,3 (2009), 423–444.

External links

 Bieszczady National Park - in English, with many links.
 Bieszczady Photo Gallery (2005)
 Bieszczady
 East Carpathians Biosphere Reserve
 The movie "Bieszczady in 38 hours," showing the beautiful landscape of Bieszczady Mountains in Poland
 The movie "Bieszczady in 38 hours," showing the beautiful landscape of Bieszczady Mountains in Poland
 Bieszczady Photostory

Mountain ranges of the Eastern Carpathians
Mountain ranges of Poland
Mountain ranges of Slovakia
Mountain ranges of Ukraine
Landforms of Podkarpackie Voivodeship